Lakin may refer to:

People
 Lakin (surname), list of people with the surname

Places
 Ləkin, Azerbaijan
 Lakin, Burma
 Lakin Township, Barton County, Kansas, United States
 Lakin Township, Harvey County, Kansas, United States
 Lakin Township, Kearny County, Kansas, United States
 Lakin, Kansas, United States
 Lakin, West Virginia
 Lakin Township, Morrison County, Minnesota, United States

Other
 E. L. Lakin, the original name of the Australian supermarket chain Flemings
 Lakin baronets, a title in the Baronetage of the United Kingdom
 Lakin Brook, a river in Delaware County, New York
 Lakin Dam, a planned dam on the N'Mai River near Lakin, Myanmar

See also
 Lakinsk, Vladimir Oblast, Russia